Ikh Bogd (lit. "great saint"), also known as Tergun Bogd, is the highest mountain of the Gobi-Altai Mountains and located in the Bayankhongor Province in Mongolia. It has an elevation of

See also
 List of mountains in Mongolia
 List of Ultras of Central Asia

References

External links
 "Tergun Bogd, Mongolia" on Peakbagger

Mountains of Mongolia
Altai Mountains
Bayankhongor Province